Gomma may refer to:

 Kingdom of Gomma, a kingdom (c. 1780–1886) in Ethiopia
 Gomma (woreda), an administrative division in Oromia Region, Ethiopia
 Goema, also spelled Gomma, a South African hand drum
 A feature of ALGOL 68 allowing collateral execution of code